Imil (Emile) Musa Basil Jarjoui MD (21 July 1936 - 24 November 2007) was a Palestinian Christian who was a member of the Palestinian Legislative Council and the PLO executive committee. Dr. Jarjoui also headed the Palestinian Ministerial Investigation Commission for the deal of Jaffa Gate and was a member of the Palestinian Legislative Council.

He was elected to the former post in 2006 as a Fatah candidate for one of the seats reserved for Christians in Jerusalem.  He dealt with Christian affairs for the Palestinian Authority while it was controlled by Fatah.  He headed the committee which welcomed the Pope John Paul II in January 2000.

He also owned the Christmas Hotel in East Jerusalem.

Jarjoui died on 23 November  2007, in Jerusalem of a heart attack. He was 72.

See also
Palestinian Christians

References

Palestinian Christians
Fatah members
2007 deaths
Year of birth missing

Members of the 2006 Palestinian Legislative Council
Members of the Executive Committee of the Palestine Liberation Organization
Palestinian pediatricians
Members of the 1996 Palestinian Legislative Council